Diana Alice Doveton (1910–1987) was an English international badminton player.

Badminton career
Diana born in 1910  was a two times winner of the All England Open Badminton Championships. She won the women's 1937 All England Badminton Championships and 1938 All England Badminton Championships doubles with Betty Uber.

She also won the 1939 Scottish Open and 1935 French Open.

References

English female badminton players
1910 births
1987 deaths